Jessen is a Danish patronymic surname, literally meaning son of Jes, which is a short form of Jens (equivalent of biblical Ioanne) from Schleswig.

Persons called Jessen:

Børge Jessen (1907–1993), Danish mathematician
Bruce Jessen (born 1949), American psychologist and creator of torture techniques used on CIA detainees
Carl Wilhelm Jessen (1764–1823), Danish Naval Officer
Christian Jessen (born 1977), British television presenter
Ernie Jessen (1905–1987), American football player
Gene Nora Jessen, American aviator and part of Mercury 13
Gianna Jessen (born 1977), American recording artist and anti-abortion activist
Ida Jessen (born 1964), Danish author
Karl Jessen (1852–1918), Russian admiral during the Russo-Japanese War
Knud Jessen (1884–1971), Danish botanist and geologist
Poul S. Jessen, Danish-American optical physicist
Poul Jessen (1926-2015), Danish gymnast

References 

Danish-language surnames
Patronymic surnames